Charles Thiffault (born January 2, 1939) is a former assistant coach. He spent 15 years in the NHL as an assistant coach with the Montreal Canadiens, Quebec Nordiques, and New York Rangers.

Biography

Thiffault was born in Cap-de-la-Madeleine, Quebec (now Trois-Rivières). He graduated from the University of Ottawa with a degree in physical education in 1960. He has a doctorate in physical education from the University of Southern California. He is a resident of Sherbrooke, Quebec.

Thiffault played for Team Canada at the 1997 Maccabiah Games in Israel.

He coached first at the University of Sherbrooke and Laval University.

Thiffault won the Stanley Cup with the team in the 1993 Stanley Cup Playoffs. Prior to joining the Canadiens, he was an assistant coach for the New York Rangers and the Quebec Nordiques before that. He was head coach of the Rouyn-Noranda Huskies for one season. He also coached the national teams of Switzerland and Italy.

References

External links 
 

1939 births
Living people
Canadian ice hockey coaches
Competitors at the 1997 Maccabiah Games
Ice hockey people from Quebec
Maccabiah Games competitors by sport
Maccabiah Games competitors for Canada
Montreal Canadiens coaches
New York Rangers coaches
Quebec Nordiques coaches
Rouyn-Noranda Huskies coaches
Sportspeople from Trois-Rivières
Stanley Cup champions
University of Ottawa alumni
Academic staff of the Université de Sherbrooke
Academic staff of Université Laval
University of Southern California alumni